The M45 Project (or M45) is the name of a  cluster announced in November 2007 by Yahoo!.

According to Yahoo!, it has approximately 4,000 processors, three terabytes of memory, 1.5 petabytes of disks, and a peak performance of more than 27 trillion calculations per second (27 teraflops), placing it among the top 50 fastest supercomputers in the world.

Name 

M45 is named after the Messier catalog number of the constellation commonly known as the Pleiades.

References

Supercomputers
M45